Mark Allan Hoâ LeBlanc (June 29, 1950 – November 1, 2019) was an American sailor. He was part of the team that won the Sears Cup in 1967. Together with John Dane III and John Cerise, he won the first Soling North American Championship 1969, Milwaukee. The same team became silver medallists in the 1970 Soling World championship held in Poole, UK.

LeBlanc fathered sailor Mark Edward LeBlanc, who came in 6th at the 2012 Summer Paralympics.

References

1950 births
2019 deaths
American male sailors (sport)
North American Champions Soling
Sportspeople from New Orleans